Malcolm Battye (birth registered third ¼ 1941) is an English former professional rugby league footballer who played in the 1960s.

Background
Malcolm Battye's birth was registered in Pontefract district, West Riding of Yorkshire, England.

Playing career

County League appearances
Malcolm Battye played in Castleford's victory in the Yorkshire County League during the 1964–65 season.

BBC2 Floodlit Trophy Final appearances
Malcolm Battye played right-, i.e. number 3, in Castleford's 4-0 victory over St. Helens in the 1965 BBC2 Floodlit Trophy Final during the 1965–66 season at Knowsley Road, St. Helens on Tuesday 14 December 1965.

Genealogical information
Malcolm Battye is the younger brother of Derek Battye, Barbara Battye, and the rugby league footballer; Colin Battye.

References

External links
Search for "Battye" at rugbyleagueproject.org
Malcolm Battye Memory Box Search at archive.castigersheritage.com

1941 births
Living people
Castleford Tigers players
Doncaster R.L.F.C. players
English rugby league players
Rugby league centres
Rugby league players from Pontefract